Peñaflor may refer to:
Peñaflor, Chile, a commune in Chile
Peñaflor (Grado), a parish in Asturias, Spain
Peñaflor, Spain, a place in Seville, Spain
Peñaflor de Gállego, a barrio in Zaragoza, Spain
Peñaflor de Hornija, a municipality in Valladolid, Spain